San Juan Comaltepec is a town and municipality in Oaxaca in south-western Mexico. The municipality covers an area of 163.31 km². 
It is part of the Choapam District in the south of the Papaloapan Region.

As of 2005, the municipality had a total population of 2389.

References

Municipalities of Oaxaca